Milinković is a surname derived from a masculine given name Milinko. It may refer to:

David Milinković (born 1994), Serbian-French footballer
Duško Milinković (born 1960), Serbian footballer
Marcos Milinkovic (born 1971), Argentine volleyball player
Marko Milinković (born 1988), Serbian footballer
Mladen Milinković (born 1968), Serbian football manager and former player
Nikola Milinković (born 1968), Yugoslav/Bosnian footballer
Sergej Milinković-Savić (born 1995), Serbian footballer
Vanja Milinković-Savić (born 1997), Serbian footballer
Zoran Milinković (born 1956), presidential candidate of the Patriots of the Serbian Diaspora in the Serbian presidential election, 2004
Zoran Milinković (footballer) (born 1968), Serbian football manager and former player

Serbian surnames
Patronymic surnames